The 1959–60 daytime network television schedule for the three major English-language commercial broadcast networks in the United States covers the weekday daytime hours from September 1959 to August 1960.

Talk shows are highlighted in yellow, local programming is white, reruns of prime-time programming are orange, game shows are pink, soap operas are chartreuse, news programs are gold and all others are light blue. New series are highlighted in bold.

Monday-Friday

Saturday

Sunday

See also
1959-60 United States network television schedule (prime-time)
1959-60 United States network television schedule (late night)

Sources
https://web.archive.org/web/20071015122215/http://curtalliaume.com/abc_day.html
https://web.archive.org/web/20071015122235/http://curtalliaume.com/cbs_day.html
https://web.archive.org/web/20071012211242/http://curtalliaume.com/nbc_day.html
Brooks, Tim & Marsh, Earle (2007). The Complete Directory To Prime Time Network and Cable TV Shows (9th Ed.).  New York: Ballantine.
Castleman, Harry & Podrazik, Wally (1984). The TV Schedule Book.  New York: McGraw-Hill Paperbacks.
Hyatt, Wesley (1997). The Encyclopedia Of Daytime Television. New York: Billboard Books.
TV schedules, NEW YORK TIMES, September 1959-September 1960 (microfilm)

United States weekday network television schedules
1959 in American television
1960 in American television